This is a list of competitions played by Houston Dynamo involving international clubs, from 2006 (when the San Jose Earthquakes players and coaches were relocated to Houston) to the most recent completed season.

By virtue of their MLS Cup victories, the Dynamo have entered prestigious competitions like the CONCACAF Champions Cup and the North American SuperLiga. During the 2008 season, the Dynamo participated in the friendly Pan-Pacific Championship, held in Honolulu, Hawaii as well as in the inaugural CONCACAF Champions League competition.

Their best result in international competitions is being runner up of the 2008 SuperLiga. The Dynamo's best results in Concacaf were runs to the semifinals of the 2007 and 2008 Champions Cup. They also made the quarterfinals of the Champions League on 3 occasions.

Recent Results 
The Dynamo returned to international competitions in the 2019 CONCACAF Champions League after winning the 2018 U.S Open Cup. Their 2019 CONCACAF season began vs Guatemala's CD Guastatoya in the Round of 16. Houston went on to win the series by a 3-1 aggregate scoreline. The Dynamo's 2019 campaign ended after a 0-3 aggragate loss vs Tigres UANL of Mexico in the Quarterfinals.

On May 29, 2019, it was announced that the Dynamo would take part in the inaugural Leagues Cup that will pit MLS teams against Liga MX teams.  The team was eliminated by Club America on penalties after a 1–1 draw at home.

CONCACAF Champions League
Notes: † Concacaf Champions Cup Era

Leagues Cup

North American Superliga

Friendly Tournaments 

Pan-Pacific Championship 2008
 Semifinals v.  Sydney FC - 3:0
Final v.  Gamba Osaka - 1:6

References 

Houston Dynamo FC

de:Houston Dynamo
es:Houston Dynamo
fr:Houston Dynamo
hr:Houston Dynamo
it:Houston Dynamo
he:יוסטון דינמו
nl:Houston Dynamo
ja:ヒューストン・ダイナモ
no:Houston Dynamo
pl:Houston Dynamo
pt:Houston Dynamo
ru:Хьюстон Динамо
simple:Houston Dynamo
fi:Houston Dynamo
sv:Houston Dynamo
zh:休斯敦迪纳摩